Jassem Al-Hashemi (Arabic:جاسم الهاشمي) (born 27 January 1996) is a Qatari footballer. He currently plays for Al-Shamal as a fullback.

External links

References

Qatari footballers
1996 births
Living people
El Jaish SC players
Qatar SC players
Al-Wakrah SC players
Al-Shamal SC players
Qatar Stars League players
Association football defenders